VirnetX is a publicly traded Internet security software and technology company based in Zephyr Cove, Nevada.
VirnetX has been described as being a patent troll, accused of marketing no actual products or services and instead earning its revenue through licensing patents and suing anyone that infringes them. The company has won intellectual property litigation against various technology companies. Kendall Larsen is the company's CEO.

Products 
VirnetX One, software-as-a-service platform, protects devices, applications, communications, and infrastructure from cyber-attacks. In 2022, VirnetX launched War Room, a secure video conferencing product.

Patents and litigation
The company's patent portfolio includes U.S. and international patents in areas such as DNS and network communication. Since 2010, VirnetX has been in litigation with companies including Apple, Cisco, and Microsoft.  Separately, in December 2014, Microsoft and VirnetX settled patent disputes over Skype technology for $23 million. In their Apple case, VirnetX worked together with SAIC, and was awarded $368 million in damages for FaceTime infringement. That ruling was partially vacated in August 2014, but two patents were confirmed to be infringed by the United States Court of Appeals for the Federal Circuit.

In December 2014, VirnetX opened access to their Gabriel platform, which builds upon their patents, and is implemented as small to medium-sized business enterprise collaboration software. Apple has appealed rulings against it in state and federal courts and demanded a jury trial for the VirtnetX case.  In February 2016 an East Texas jury unanimously ruled in federal court that Apple had willfully violated 13 VirnetX patents. The jury said Apple must pay VirnetX $625.6 million for infringing four of the patents, and the court was considering ongoing royalty rates and punitive damages. At Apple's request, the ruling was vacated in August 2016 and the case sent back to be retried separating the patents into two groups. VirnetX has filed an injunction to block sales of Facetime and iMessage, claiming that its own platforms are suffering. 

The first retrial, conducted from Sept 26 to Sept 30, 2016, resulted in another unanimous jury verdict for VirnetX. The verdict re-affirmed patent violations enabling Facetime and iMessage and awarded $439.7 million to VirnetX.  The remaining two patents will be tried separately.

In 2018, Apple was ordered to pay $502.6 million to VirnetX, but that order was vacated in 2019. Apple was still found by the jury to be infringing two patents, but attempted to appeal this judgement. In February 2020, the U.S. Supreme Court did not consider an appeal made by Apple. Apple's request for a new trial was overturned in January 2021.

In March 2021, the patent and trial appeal board ruled that two of VirnetX's patents were invalid in its dispute with Apple.

References

External links 
 VirnetX official webpage

Companies listed on the New York Stock Exchange
Companies based in Nevada